Events from the year 1936 in Michigan.

Office holders

State office holders
 Governor of Michigan: Frank Fitzgerald (Republican)
 Lieutenant Governor of Michigan: Thomas Reed (Republican) 
 Michigan Attorney General: David H. Crowley 
 Michigan Secretary of State: Orville E. Atwood (Republican)
 Speaker of the Michigan House of Representatives: George A. Schroeder
 Chief Justice, Michigan Supreme Court:

Mayors of major cities
 Mayor of Detroit: Frank Couzens (Republican)
 Mayor of Grand Rapids: William Timmers/Tunis Johnson
 Mayor of Flint: George E. Boysen/Harold E. Bradshaw
 Mayor of Saginaw: Frank Marxer
 Mayor of Lansing: Max A. Templeton
 Mayor of Ann Arbor: Robert A. Campbell

Federal office holders
 U.S. Senator from Michigan: James J. Couzens (Republican)/Prentiss M. Brown (Democrat)
 U.S. Senator from Michigan: Arthur Vandenberg (Republican) 
 House District 1: George G. Sadowski (Democrat)
 House District 2: Earl C. Michener (Republican)
 House District 3: Verner Main (Republican)
 House District 4: Clare Hoffman (Republican)
 House District 5: Carl E. Mapes (Republican)
 House District 6: William W. Blackney (Republican)
 House District 7: Jesse P. Wolcott (Republican)
 House District 8: Fred L. Crawford (Republican)
 House District 9: Albert J. Engel (Republican)
 House District 10: Roy O. Woodruff (Republican)
 House District 11: Prentiss M. Brown (Democrat)
 House District 12: Frank Eugene Hook (Democrat)
 House District 13: Clarence J. McLeod (Republican)
 House District 14: Louis C. Rabaut (Democrat)
 House District 15: John D. Dingell Sr. (Democrat)
 House District 16: John Lesinski Sr. (Democrat)
 House District 17: George Anthony Dondero (Republican)

Population

Sports

Baseball
 1936 Detroit Tigers season – Under player-manager Mickey Cochrane, the Tigers compiled an 83-71 record and finished in second place in the American League. The team's statistical leaders included second baseman Charlie Gehringer with a .354 batting average and 60 doubles, Goose Goslin with 24 home runs and 125 RBIs, and Tommy Bridges with 23 wins and a 3.60 earned run average.
 1936 Michigan Wolverines baseball season - Under head coach Ray Fisher, the Wolverines compiled a 20–5 record and won the Big Ten Conference championship. Berger Larson was the team captain.

American football
 1936 Detroit Lions season – Under head coach Potsy Clark, the Lions compiled an 8–4 record and placed third in the NFL's Western Division. The team's statistical leaders included Dutch Clark with 467 passing yards and 73 points scored, Ace Gutowsky with 827 rushing yards, and Harry Ebding with 194 receiving yards. 
 1936 Michigan Wolverines football team – The Wolverines compiled a 1–7 record under head coach Harry Kipke.
 1936 Michigan State Spartans football team – The Spartans compiled a 6–1–2 record under head coach Charlie Bachman.
 1936 Michigan State Normal Hurons football team – The Hurons compiled a record of 6–2 and outscored opponents by a total of 76 to 53. 
 1936 Detroit Titans football team – The Titans compiled a 7–3 record under head coach Gus Dorais.
 1936 Wayne Tartars football team – The Tartars compiled a 5–2–1 record under head coach Joe Gembis.

Basketball
 1935–36 Western Michigan Broncos men's basketball team – Under head coach Buck Read, the Broncos compiled a 15–3 record.
 1935–36 Detroit Titans men's basketball team – Under head coach Lloyd Brazil, the Titans compiled a 12–5 record.
 1935–36 Michigan Wolverines men's basketball team – Under head coach Franklin Cappon, the Wolverines compiled an 8–12 record. Johnny Gee and Chelso Tamagno were members of the team.
 1935–36 Michigan State Spartans men's basketball team – Under head coach Benjamin Van Alstyne, the Spartans compiled an 8–9 record.
 1935–36 Wayne Tartars men's basketball team – Under coach Newman Ertell, Wayne compiled a 13–4 record.

Ice hockey
 1935–36 Detroit Red Wings season – Under coach Jack Adams, the Red Wings compiled a 24–16–8 record, finished in first place in the National Hockey League (NHL) American Division, and defeated the Toronto Maple Leafs in the 1936 Stanley Cup Finals. The team's statistical leaders included Marty Barry with 21 goals and 40 points and Herbie Lewis with 23 assists. 
 1935–36 Michigan Wolverines men's ice hockey team – Under head coach Ed Lowrey, the Wolverines compiled a 7–9 record.
 1935–36 Michigan Tech Huskies men's ice hockey team – Under head coach Bert Noblet, the Huskies compiled a 6–9–1 record.

Other
 Port Huron to Mackinac Boat Race – On July 19, the Baccarat owned by Russell Alger won the race with a corrected time of 40 hours, 27 minutes, 45 seconds.
 Michigan Open - On July 21, Marvin Stahl from Green Ridge Country Club in Grand Rapids won the event with a 284 total (four under par) in Jackson, Michigan.
 APBA Gold Cup – On July 26, Kaye Don driving Horace Dodge's Impshi, representing the Detroit Yacht Club, won the Gold Cup on the waters of Lake George.

Chronology of events

January

February

March

April

May

June

July

August

September

October

November

December

Births
 January 14 - Linda Lawson, television and film actress and singer, in Ann Arbor, Michigan
 January 27 - Samuel C. C. Ting, Nobel Prize-winning physicist who discovered the subatomic J/ψ particle, in Ann Arbor, Michigan
 February 11 - Burt Reynolds, actor (Deliverance, The Longest Yard, Smokey and the Bandit, Boogie Nights), in Lansing, Michigan
 February 29 - Jack R. Lousma, NASA astronaut (Skylab, Space Shuttle STS-3 commander), in Grand Rapids, Michigan
 March 26 - Jim Ninowski, NFL quarterback (1958-1969), in Detroit
 March 29 - Judith Guest, novelist (Ordinary People) and screenwriter (Ordinary People), in Detroit
 April 10 - Bobby Smith, one of the lead singers of Motown's The Spinners, in Detroit
 April 12 - Tony Earl, Governor of Wisconsin (1983-1987), in Lansing, Michigan
 June 6 - Levi Stubbs, lead singer of Motown's Four Tops, in Detroit
 June 14 - Dave Whitsell, NFL cornerback (1958-1969), in Shelby, Michigan
 June 15 - Renaldo Benson, one of Motown's Four Tops and co-writer of "What's Going On", in Detroit
 June 26 - Nancy Willard, author (Anatole trilogy, A Visit to William Blake's Inn), in Ann Arbor, Michigan
 June 28 - Fred Gladding, Major League Baseball pitcher (1961-1973), NL saves leader in 1969, in Flat Rock, Michigan
 August 16 - Ken W. Clawson, White House Communications Director under Presidents Nixon and Ford, in Monroe, Michigan
 September 11 - Paul Riser, trombonist, Motown musical arranger, one of the "Funk Brothers", in Detroit
 December 15 - Donald Goines, novelist (including the Kenyatta series), in Detroit

Gallery of 1936 births

Deaths
 January 18 - John Biddle, Detroit native, career Army officer, superintendent of the U.S. Military Academy, at age 76 in San Antonio, Texas
 February 3 - Charles B. Warren, U.S. Ambassador to Mexico (1924) and Japan (1921-1922), at age 65 in Grosse Pointe, Michigan
 February 16 - Roy D. Chapin, co-founder of Hudson Motor Co. and U.S. Secretary of Commerce (1932-1933), at age 55 in Detroit
 May 19 - Joe S. Jackson, sports writer and founder of Baseball Writers' Association of America, at age 64 in San Francisco
 September 20 - Perce Wilson, quarterback for Detroit Heralds in 1920, the first season of the NFL, at age 46
 October 22 - James J. Couzens, Mayor of Detroit (1919-1922) and U.S. Senator (1922-1936), at age 64 in Detroit
 October 31 - Deacon McGuire, Major League Baseball player (1884-1912), only person to play for Detroit Wolverines and Detroit Tigers, at age 72 in Duck Lake, Michigan
 November 6 - Henry Bourne Joy, President of the Packard Motor Car Company (1909-1926) and one of the organizers of the Lincoln Highway Association, at age 71
 November 30 - Fred W. Green, Governor of Michigan (1927-1931), at age 65 in Munising, Michigan

Gallery of 1936 deaths

See also
 History of Michigan
 History of Detroit

References